The 1928 United States Senate election in Virginia was held on November 6, 1928. Incumbent Senator Claude A. Swanson was re-elected to a fourth term.  This is the most recent U.S. Senate election in Virginia history when a candidate ran completely unopposed.

Results

See also 
 1928 United States Senate elections

References

Virginia
1928
United States Senate
Single-candidate elections